Jenő Törzs (23 April 1887 – 1 February 1946) was a Hungarian film and stage actor of Jewish heritage.

Selected filmography
 Secret of St. Job Forest (1917)
 Alraune (1918)
 The Sunflower Woman (1918)
 Oliver Twist (1919)
 Number 111 (1919)
  (1933)
 The Dream Car (1934)
 Mother (1937)
 Number 111 (1938)
 Black Diamonds (1938)

Bibliography
 Kulik, Karol. Alexander Korda: The Man Who Could Work Miracles. Virgin Books, 1990.

External links

1887 births
1946 deaths
Hungarian male film actors
Hungarian male silent film actors
20th-century Hungarian male actors
Hungarian Jews
Hungarian male stage actors
Male actors from Budapest